The Supreme Court (lit. Highest Court) is the supreme court and the third and final instance in all civil and criminal cases in the Kingdom of Denmark. It is based at Christiansborg Palace in Copenhagen which also houses the Danish Parliament and the Prime Minister's office.

History
The Supreme Court was founded on 14 February 1661 by King Frederik III as a replacement of King Christian IV's King's Court (da. Kongens Retterting).  It was based at first Copenhagen Castle later Christiansborg Palace, which was built in its place on the same site at Slotsholmen, and originally  consisted of 30 justices. From its foundation and until the adoption of the Constitution of 1849, the court was formally an instrument of the king, only deciding cases by a majority vote in the king's absence, most kings only attended the first meeting each supreme court year. An office as justitiarius to lead the court was instituted as early as 1674 (from 1919 with title of President). As absolute monarch the king retained the inherent power to overrule the court, which happened on one occasion. Aside from this the court routinely exercised the power to commute criminal sentences, a power that was written into the constitution of 1849.

After the 1794 Fire of the Christiansborg Palace, the Supreme Court moved first to the Prince's Mansion (da. Prinsens Palæ) until 1854, now housing the National Museum of Denmark, and then to one of the four mansions of Amalienborg Palace (1854–1864), before moving back to Slotsholmen. After the fire of the second Christianborg Palace in 1884 the Supreme Court had to move once again and was based at Bernstorffs Palæ in Bredgade until 1919 when it could move back to the present Christiansborg Palace.

Since a rule change in 2007, the court have had a greater focus on test cases that establish precedent.

Function
The Supreme Court functions as a civil and criminal appellate court for cases from the subordinate courts. Since a decision cannot normally be appealed more than once, County Court cases rarely reach Supreme Court-level, though this may be the case if the independent Board of Appeals grants a leave of appeal.

Significant civil cases with issues of principle, however, are typically deferred to one of the two Danish High Courts as courts of first instance. In those cases sentences from the Eastern or Western High Courts (Østre Landsret and Vestre Landsret) may be directly appealed to The Supreme Court.

As its name indicates, the Supreme Court is the highest Court in the Kingdom of Denmark and its judgments cannot be appealed to another Danish court. It is split into two chambers which both hear all types of cases. A case is heard by at least five judges. In all, the court consists of normally 15 judges and a President.

Unlike criminal cases in the lower courts, the Supreme Court does not deal with the issue of guilt. However, the basis on which the lower court reached its verdict may be brought into consideration and edited. In criminal trials by jury in the first instance, the defence may appeal on grounds of judicial error regarding the judges' direction to the jury (the summing-up of the theoretical foundations, which should be taken into consideration when the jurors deliberate).

Current members
There are 18 judges in the Supreme Court. One of the Supreme Court justices is president of the Supreme Court, appointed by the other judges. A judge is the chairman of the Appeals Permission Board and a judge is on leave to serve as a judge of the European Court of Justice in Luxembourg.

The Judges of the Supreme Court, like other judges, are appointed by the Minister of Justice on the recommendation of the Independent Board of Judges.

Judges shall be retired at the end of the month in which they reach the age of 70, as according to section 5 of the Civil Service Act.

See also

 Courts of Denmark

References

External links
 Source

 
Denmark
1661 establishments in Denmark
Courts and tribunals established in 1661